is a passenger railway station located in the city of Bizen, Okayama Prefecture, Japan, operated by the West Japan Railway Company (JR West).

Lines

Station layout
The station consists of one side platform serving a single bi-directional track. The station is unattended.

Adjacent stations

History
Iri Station was opened on 25 March 1958. With the privatization of Japanese National Railways (JNR) on 1 April 1987, the station came under the control of JR West.

Passenger statistics
In fiscal 2019, the station was used by an average of 180 passengers daily

Surrounding area
Bizen Municipal Iri Junior High School (former Okayama Prefectural Bizen Higashi High School)
Bizen Municipal Iri Elementary School
Japan National Route 250

See also
List of railway stations in Japan

References

External links

 JR West Station Official Site

Railway stations in Okayama Prefecture
Akō Line
Railway stations in Japan opened in 1958
Bizen, Okayama